The U.S. Highways in Alabama are the subset of the United States Numbered Highway System. These highways in the U.S. state of Alabama are maintained by the Alabama Department of Transportation (ALDOT). There are 19 U.S. Highways that travels through Alabama, totaling . The shortest is US 72 Alternate, crossing  of North Alabama. One former U.S. Highway existed in Alabama: US 241. It traveled through the eastern part of the state. US 241 was replaced by US 280 and US 431 in 1954.

List

Special routes

See also

References

 
U.S. Highways